The Northwestern Wildcats men's basketball team is an NCAA Division I college basketball team representing Northwestern University in the Big Ten Conference. Men's basketball was introduced at Northwestern in 1901. Since 2013, the team has been coached by Chris Collins. The Wildcats have advanced to the NCAA tournament twice, in 2017 and 2023, after being the only longstanding member of a Power Five conference to have never made the tournament. The Wildcats have won two Big Ten conference championships (1931 and 1933).

History

Although Northwestern had great success in the early part of the 20th century, it has spent most of the time since World War II in the bottom half of the Big Ten. The Wildcats were retroactively selected as the 1930–31 national champion by both the Helms Athletic Foundation and the Premo-Porretta Power Poll, and have won only one other conference title, in 1933. It has only finished above fourth place twice since World War II, and did not have a winning record in conference play from 1968 until 2017. During that time, only the 2003–04 team even managed a .500 conference record. On March 1, 2017, the Wildcats won their 10th conference game (a 67–65 win over Michigan) to clinch their first winning Big Ten record in almost half a century. That season also saw the Wildcats make their first NCAA Tournament in school history, winning their first NCAA tournament game 68–66 against Vanderbilt. The Wildcats have also appeared in the National Invitation Tournament seven times (1983, 1994, 1999, 2009, 2010, 2011, 2012).

The very first NCAA tournament championship was held at Northwestern in March 1939. Until making their first NCAA tournament in 2017, Northwestern had been one of five original NCAA Division I schools and the only school from a power conference to have never played an NCAA Tournament game. Northwestern won their first Tournament game, defeating Vanderbilt 68–66. The Wildcats lost in the Second Round to No. 1-seeded Gonzaga.

The 2022-23 team finished in a tie for second place in the Big Ten regular season, which is their best finish in the conference since the 1958-59 season.

Coaching history

Sources:

Postseason

NCAA Division I tournament results
The Wildcats have appeared in the NCAA tournament twice. Their record is 2–2.

NIT results
The Wildcats have appeared in the National Invitation Tournament (NIT) seven times. Their combined record is 5–7.

Notable players

All-time statistical leaders

Career leaders
 Points Scored: John Shurna (2,038, 2008-2012)
 Assists: Bryant McIntosh (541, 2014–2018)
 Rebounds: Evan Eschmeyer (995, 1995–1999)
 Steals: Pat Baldwin (272, 1990–1994)
 Blocks: Alexandru Olah (169, 2013–2016)

Single-season Leaders
 Points Scored: John Shurna (661, 2012)
 Assists: Bryant McIntosh  (213, 2016)
 Rebounds: Jim Pitts (321, 1966)
 Steals: Pat Baldwin (90, 1991)
 Blocks: Jim Pitts (123, 1966)

Single-game leaders
 Points Scored: Rich Falk (49, 1964)
 Assists: Bryant McIntosh (16, 2018)
 Rebounds: Jim Pitts (29, 1965)
 Steals: Nate Carter (9, 2011)
 Blocks: Jim Pitts (10, 1966)
Source for all statistical leaders:

All-Americans

Source:

References

External links